Aldo Bozzi (22 February 1909 – 1 November 1987) was an Italian lawyer and politician. He was a long term member of the Italian Parliament representing the Italian Liberal Party. He served as the minister of transport for one year between 1972 and 1973.

Biography
Bozzi was born in Rome on 22 February 1909. He received a degree in law. He was a member of the Italian Liberal Party. From 1953 he was a member of the Italian Parliament and also, served at the Italian Senate. He was the undersecretary of the state ministry for finance from 9 July 1955 19 May 1957 in the first cabinet of Prime Minister Antonio Segni. Bozzi headed several parliament commissions, including the one formed in May 1961 to investigate the related public bodies responsible for the construction of Fiumicino airport. Bozzi was the minister of transport between 30 June 1972 and 7 July 1973 in the cabinet led by Prime Minister Giulio Andreotti. From November 1983 to January 1985 Bozzi headed the Parliament commission on the institutional reform consisted of twenty senators and twenty deputies. He died in Rome on 1 November 1987 at the age of 78.

References

External links

20th-century Italian lawyers
1909 births
1987 deaths
Transport ministers of Italy
Politicians from Rome
Italian Liberal Party politicians
Members of the Senate of the Republic (Italy)
Deputies of Legislature II of Italy
Deputies of Legislature IX of Italy